1965 saw Boca Juniors win the league title and Independiente retain their Copa Libertadores title.

Primera División
The Primera was expanded from 16 to 18 teams in 1965.

League table

Relegation
There was no relegation due to the expansion of the Primera División from 18 to 20 teams.

Copa Libertadores

Boca Juniors and River Plate qualified for Copa Libertadores 1966 via the league, Independiente qualified as the Libertadores champions of 1965.

Copa Libertadores 1965
Independiente: Champions
Boca Juniors: Semi-finalist

References

Argentina 1965 by Pablo Ciullini at rsssf.
Copa Libertadores 1965 by José Luis Pierrend, John Beuker, Osvaldo José Gorgazzi and Karel Stokkermans at rsssf.

 
Seasons in Argentine football
Argentine

pl:I liga argentyńska w piłce nożnej (1965)